Phillip Andrew Arnold (born April 26, 1992, in Marietta, Georgia), known professionally as Pip, is an American, funk-pop artist who participated in season 2 of The Voice as part of Team Adam Levine.

Early life 
During his childhood, Pip was interested in music, reading, lacrosse, and Boy Scouts of America, attaining the rank of Eagle Scout in 2009.

Pip's musical aspirations were fostered by his older sister who holds a degree in musical theater. Growing up in a large musical family Pip learned to play various instruments, mainly piano, sang lead in local shows, and performed/entertained in the Marietta area. During four years at Kennesaw Mountain High School Pip starred in several plays, landing the lead of Huckleberry Finn during his senior year in the musical Big River.

The Glee Project and The Voice
Pip auditioned in 2011 for Oxygen show The Glee Project Season 1, landing a spot only on the first episode's audition rounds. In 2011 Pip was chosen as 1 of 5 select performers from Atlanta's 11alive "The Voice" VIP Early Auditions Contest (Pip was selected during a blind audition by co-host Chesley McNeil). Pip moved forward into national auditions and was picked as 1 of 120 contestants to fly out to Studio City, California for the blind auditions of NBCUniversal TV reality show The Voice.

Pip first appeared in episode 3 of season 2, auditioning with the song "The House of the Rising Sun". Judges Adam Levine, Blake Shelton, Cee Lo Green and Christina Aguilera all turned around for Pip; he picked Levine.

Pip competed on "Team Adam" on season 2 of The Voice, retaining his status on the team by winning the "Battle Rounds" against Nathan Parrett, singing Amy Winehouse's "You Know I'm No Good". He performed The Killers' song "When You Were Young" on the live shows, moving on in the competition with teammates Tony Lucca, Katrina Parker, and Mathai . On April 23, 2012, he performed Keane's "Somewhere Only We Know" for the quarter-finals, but was instantly eliminated by Levine at the end of the show. Despite being eliminated he reappeared on the season 2 finale performing "I Want You Back" on stage with Jermaine Paul, Jamar Rogers, and James Massone.

After The Voice 
After The Voice, Pip moved to Los Angeles to continue his music career.
Pip's debut single, "Who Cares", was released September 11, 2012. It is the lead single from his debut EP No Formalities, released on January 4, 2013.

In February 2014, Pip signed a deal with Indi.com to start marketing and distributing music on a bigger scale. Releasing the single "Hooked" on May 19, 2014, with an EP and possible tour in the works for later in 2014. Indi.com was backing Pip's single "Trash Talk", partnering it with a new music video and anti-bullying campaign.

In November 2015, Pip joined the cast of For The Record: The Brat Pack on Norwegian Escape for five months, as “The Geek”, a role he would later reprise in November 2016.

Pip has also been involved in making movies with long time collaborator Nanea Miyata. He served as First Assistant Director on Christmas Harmony (2018), where he also appeared in a minor role, and once again in Dead In The Water (2021) which he also wrote and released his single "Burn" for.

Currently, Pip is part of a NYC-based wedding/event band called “The Chromantics”

Personal life
In 2012, Pip set up a charity called Youth in Mission to help fund youth involvement in mission work around the world, in honor of his mentor, missionary, and close family friend, the late Stewart Hay. In 2014 the charity became a non-profit corporation, with Pip as president. Pip currently resides in New York City. Pip is openly gay.

Discography

Studio albums
2014: No Formalities

Singles
2014: "Hooked"
2021: "Burn"
2022: “Nothing / Sad N Stuff”

Featured
2022: “Beam Me Up” by Mystery Skulls

References

External links
 Official website

1992 births
Living people
21st-century American singers
American gay musicians
American LGBT singers
LGBT people from Georgia (U.S. state)
21st-century American male singers
20th-century LGBT people
21st-century LGBT people
The Voice (franchise) contestants